Frank Feltscher Martínez (born 17 May 1988) is a Swiss-Venezuelan professional footballer who plays for Atlético Venezuela as an attacking midfielder.

Club career 
Feltscher was born in Bülach, Switzerland. After emerging through the youth ranks at Grasshoppers, he joined U.S. Lecce in the summer of 2008. He was loaned out to AC Bellinzona until the end of the 2008–09.

International career 
Feltscher played for the Switzerland national under-21 team from 2007.

On 2 September 2011, he made the starting line-up for Venezuela national team in a friendly match against Argentina in India.

Personal life
His brother, Rolf Feltscher, plays for MSV Duisburg as a defender and step-brother Mattia Desole, plays for FC Freienbach. Lived in Venezuela for several years as a kid playing football at Colegio Humboldt where he also studied with his brother.

Frank holds Venezuelan, Swiss

International goals
Scores and results list Venezuela's goal tally first, score column indicates score after each Feltscher goal.

External links
 
 

1988 births
Living people
People from Bülach
Swiss people of Venezuelan descent
People with acquired Venezuelan citizenship
Swiss emigrants to Venezuela
Venezuelan people of Swiss descent
Association football midfielders
Venezuelan footballers
Venezuela international footballers
Switzerland under-21 international footballers
FC Winterthur players
Grasshopper Club Zürich players
U.S. Lecce players
AC Bellinzona players
FC Aarau players
AEL Limassol players
Debreceni VSC players
Zulia F.C. players
Águilas Doradas Rionegro players
Swiss Super League players
Serie A players
Cypriot First Division players
Venezuelan Primera División players
Categoría Primera A players
Venezuelan expatriate footballers
Venezuelan expatriate sportspeople in Switzerland
Venezuelan expatriate sportspeople in Italy
Venezuelan expatriate sportspeople in Cyprus
Venezuelan expatriate sportspeople in Hungary
Venezuelan expatriate sportspeople in Colombia
Expatriate footballers in Switzerland
Expatriate footballers in Italy
Expatriate footballers in Cyprus
Expatriate footballers in Hungary
Expatriate footballers in Colombia
Sportspeople from the canton of Zürich